Frank Beck (born 26 June 1961) is a German former fencer. Beck fought for the Fencing-Club Tauberbischofsheim. He won a silver medal in the team foil event at the 1984 Summer Olympics.

References

External links
 

1961 births
Living people
German male fencers
Olympic fencers of West Germany
Fencers at the 1984 Summer Olympics
Olympic silver medalists for West Germany
Olympic medalists in fencing
People from Tauberbischofsheim
Sportspeople from Stuttgart (region)
Medalists at the 1984 Summer Olympics
20th-century German people